Renia pulverosalis is a litter moth of the family Erebidae. It is found in North America, including Maryland and Utah.

External links
Moths of south-eastern Arizona

Herminiinae
Moths described in 1895